Maharashtra Institute of Medical Education and Research (MIMER) is a medical college located in Talegaon, Pune, Maharashtra, India. The institute is recognised by the Medical Council of India and is under Maharashtra University of Health Sciences. It was founded in 1995 with a hospital named Dr. Bhausaheb Sardesai Rural Talegaon Hospital. The Talegaon General Hospital was visited by Mahatma Gandhi in 1945. It is also listed under International Medical Education Directory.

Courses

UG Course
There are 150 recognised seats for MBBS - 4.5 yrs + 1 yr internship.

PG Courses
3 years courses
 MD Medicine - (4 seats)
 MS General Surgery - (6 seats)
 MS Ophthalmology - (5 seats)
 MS OBGY - (2 seats)
 MD Biochemistry - (1 seat)
 MD Community Medicine - (2 seats)
 MS Orthopedics (6 seats)
 MD Skin (2 seats)
 MD Pathology (2 seats)
 MD Pharmacology  (2 seats)
 MD Microbiology (2 seats)
 MD Psychiatry (2 seats)
 MD Anesthesiology (2 seats)
 MS ENT (3 seats)

Governance 
The college is a part of the MAEER's MIT, Pune group of institutes which was founded by Vishwanath Karad.

 Medical Director: 
Dr. Suresh Ghaisas

 Executive Director (Academic): 
Dr.(Mrs.)Suchitra Nagare

 Executive Director (Hospital Admin.):
Dr. Virendra Ghaisas

 Principal:
Dr. Swati Belsare

Departments

 Anatomy
 Physiology
 Biochemistry 
 Pharmacology
 Pathology
 Microbiology
 Forensic Medicine
 Community Medicine
 ENT
 Ophthalmology
 General Medicine
 General Surgery
 Orthopedics
 Obstetrics & Gynaecology
 Paediatrics
 Anaesthesiology
 Radiology
 Pulmonology
 Dentistry

References

External links 
MIMER website

Medical colleges in Maharashtra
Education in Pune district
Affiliates of Maharashtra University of Health Sciences
Educational institutions established in 1995
1995 establishments in Maharashtra